A World of Love  is a 1975 Argentine comedy film directed by Mario Sábato with a screenplay by Diego Santillán and Luz Tambascio. It stars Andrea Del Boca, Ubaldo Martínez, Miguel Ligero and Nelly Beltrán.

The film premiered on 17 July 1975. Newspaper La Nación described it as an "optimistic fable", but Osvaldo Iakkidis referred to it in El Cronista Comercial as "monotonous".

Plot
An orphaned girl lives with her maternal grandfather. When he is hospitalized due to a heart attack, the girl is taken to her paternal grandparents who will try to take her away from him.

Cast
 Andrea Del Boca as Marcela
 Ubaldo Martínez as Don Jacinto
 Miguel Ligero as Francisco
 Nelly Beltrán as Doña Gladys
 Betiana Blum as Estela
 Augusto Codecá
 Martín Fonseca
 Marta Ecco
 Carlos Gros
 Blanca Lagrotta

References

External links
 

1975 comedy films
Argentine comedy films
Films directed by Mario Sábato
1970s Spanish-language films
1975 films